Bhattan de Savaiye (bhaṭāṁ dē sava'ī'ē), also known as Bhatt Bani (Gurmukhi: ਭੱਟ ਬਾਣੀ; bhaṭa bāṇī), is a name given to 123 Savaiyas composed by various   Bhatts, which are present in Guru Granth Sahib, scripture of Sikhs. According to various scholars, these Savaiyas are eulogies of first five Gurus of Sikhism.

Generally, it is accepted that there were 11 Bhatts whose hymns are present in Adi Granth, but controversy still exist that there are 12 or 17.

Structure
The savaiye starts from page 1389 from Savaiye Mahalla Pehla Ke  and ends at page 1409 of Guru Granth Sahib. The savaiyas are under five titles:
Savaiya Mahalla Pehle Ke 1
Savaiye Mahalle Duje Ke 2
Savaiye Mahalle Teeje Ke 3
Savaiye Mahalle Chauthe Ke 4
Savaiye Mahalle Panjve Ke 5

Following is list of Bhatts and their number of savaiyas composed by them:

Author controversy
Tall or Kal: A Swaiya in name of Bhatt Tall, which according to some scholars is a Gurmukhi typo as it is Kal i.e Bhatt Kalshar.
No. of Bhatts: Few author believe there are 17 Bhatts including above. Others are Bhatt Sevak, Bhatt Jalh, Bhatt Jalan.

See also 

 Bhatra Sikhs
 Bhat Vahis

References

Adi Granth
Sikh scripture
Hymns